Corey J. Martin is a United States Air Force major general who serves as commander of the Eighteenth Air Force. He previously served as the director of operations of the United States Transportation Command from 2020 to 2022.

References

External links

Living people
Place of birth missing (living people)
Recipients of the Defense Superior Service Medal
Recipients of the Distinguished Flying Cross (United States)
Recipients of the Legion of Merit
United States Air Force generals
United States Air Force personnel of the Iraq War
Year of birth missing (living people)